109 Street is an arterial road in central Edmonton, Alberta, Canada. It takes travelers out of Downtown to the south to Old Strathcona, and to the north to the Kingsway area. It passes several Edmonton landmarks including the Garneau Theatre, Alberta Legislature Building, MacEwan University, RCMP "K" Division Headquarters, and Kingsway Mall. It is a one-way street, southbound, from 97 Avenue to Saskatchewan Drive (88 Avenue), to cross the North Saskatchewan River on the narrow High Level Bridge. Before Edmonton's amalgamation with Strathcona in 1912, the Edmonton portion was known as 9th Street while the Strathcona portion was known as 5th Street W. 109 Street between Whyte Avenue and Kingsway is part of the original alignment of Highway 2 through Edmonton, the designation was moved to Whitemud Drive in the 1980s.

Neighbourhoods
List of neighbourhoods 109 Street runs through, in order from south to north:
Pleasantview
Parkallen
Allendale
McKernan
Queen Alexandra
Garneau
Downtown
Oliver
Queen Mary Park
Central McDougall

Major intersections
This is a list of major intersections, starting at the south end of 109 Street.

Sinkhole 
On October 12, 2020, a 23 meter deep sinkhole opened up on the intersection of 61 Avenue and 109 St.

Photos

See also 

 List of streets in Edmonton
 Transportation in Edmonton

References

Roads in Edmonton